Çalışırlar is a village in the Sason District, Batman Province, Turkey. The village had a population of 296 in 2021.

References 

Villages in Sason District